The 1990–91 New York Knicks season was the 45th season for the Knicks in the National Basketball Association. In the off-season, the Knicks signed free agent John Starks, who played in the Continental Basketball Association the previous season. The Knicks changed their on-court leadership early in the season as head coach Stu Jackson was replaced by John MacLeod after 15 games. After a 6–3 start to the season, the Knicks lost eight of their next nine games, and held a 20–27 record at the All-Star break. They recovered to a 34–33 record near the end of the season, but then went 5–10 in their last 15 games. New York finished in third place in the Atlantic Division with a 39–43 record, and earned the #8 seed in the Eastern Conference for the NBA Playoffs. 

Patrick Ewing led the Knicks with 26.6 points, averaged 11.2 rebounds and led them with 3.2 blocks per game. He was named to the All-NBA Second Team, and was selected for the 1991 NBA All-Star Game. Kiki Vandeweghe finished second on the team in scoring, averaging 16.3 points per game, while Gerald Wilkins provided them with 13.8 points per game, and Charles Oakley led the team with 12.1 rebounds per game. Mark Jackson led the team with 6.3 assists per game, playing most of the season off the bench as backup point guard behind Maurice Cheeks.

In the first round of the Eastern Conference playoffs, the Knicks were swept in three straight games by Michael Jordan and the eventual NBA champion Chicago Bulls. The Knicks had suffered a 41-point margin in a 126–85 Game 1 road loss to the Bulls. The Bulls would reach the NBA Finals and defeat the Los Angeles Lakers in five games, winning their first-ever championship.

Following the season, Cheeks was traded to the Atlanta Hawks, and Trent Tucker was dealt to the Phoenix Suns. For the season, the Knicks slightly redesigned their uniforms, replacing their alternate "NY" logo on the left leg of their shorts with their current primary logo. These uniforms remained in use until 1992.

NBA Draft

Roster

Regular season

Season standings

y – clinched division title
x – clinched playoff spot

z – clinched division title
y – clinched division title
x – clinched playoff spot

Record vs. opponents

Game log

Playoffs

|- align="center" bgcolor="#ffcccc"
| 1
| April 25
| @ Chicago
| L 85–126
| Kiki VanDeWeghe (19)
| Charles Oakley (11)
| Maurice Cheeks (7)
| Chicago Stadium18,676
| 0–1
|- align="center" bgcolor="#ffcccc"
| 2
| April 28
| @ Chicago
| L 79–89
| Patrick Ewing (24)
| Ewing, Oakley (10)
| Trent Tucker (3)
| Chicago Stadium18,676
| 0–2
|- align="center" bgcolor="#ffcccc"
| 3
| April 30
| Chicago
| L 94–103
| Ewing, VanDeWeghe (20)
| Patrick Ewing (14)
| Maurice Cheeks (7)
| Madison Square Garden18,021
| 0–3
|-

Player statistics

NOTE: Please write the player statistics in alphabetical order by last name.

Season

Playoffs

Awards and records
Patrick Ewing, All-NBA Second Team

Transactions

References

External links
1990–91 New York Knickerbockers Statistics

New York Knicks seasons
New York Knicks
New York Knicks
New York Knick
1990s in Manhattan
Madison Square Garden